Noah Östlund (born 11 March 2004) is a Swedish professional ice hockey center for Djurgårdens IF of the HockeyAllsvenskan (Allsv) on loan as a prospect to the Buffalo Sabres of the National Hockey League (NHL). He was drafted 16th overall by the Sabres in the 2022 NHL Entry Draft.

Playing career
Östlund made his professional debut for Djurgårdens IF during the 2021–22 season, where he appeared in 11 games. He also appeared in 32 games for Djurgårdens' J20 team where he recorded nine goals and 33 assists. 

Following his selection in the 2022 NHL Entry Draft, Östlund was signed by the Buffalo Sabres to a three-year, entry-level contract on 16 July 2022. He was returned on loan to continue his development in Sweden with Djurgårdens IF in the HockeyAllsvenskan.

International play

Östlund represented Sweden at the 2022 IIHF World U18 Championships where he recorded four goals and six assists in six games and won a gold medal.

Career statistics

Regular season and playoffs

International

References

External links
 

2004 births
Living people
Buffalo Sabres draft picks
Djurgårdens IF Hockey players
National Hockey League first-round draft picks
People from Nykvarn Municipality
Swedish ice hockey centres
21st-century Swedish people